Ropica fuscolaterimaculata is a species of beetle in the family Cerambycidae. It was described by Hayashi in 1974.

References

fuscolaterimaculata
Beetles described in 1974